Bruno Frietsch (2 December 1896 – 9 December 1996) was a Finnish sports shooter. He competed in the 50 m rifle event at the 1936 Summer Olympics.

See also
 List of centenarians (sportspeople)

References

External links
 

1896 births
1996 deaths
Finnish centenarians
Finnish male sport shooters
Olympic shooters of Finland
Shooters at the 1936 Summer Olympics
People from Hanko
Men centenarians
Sportspeople from Uusimaa